Elke Sehmisch (born 4 May 1955) is a German former swimmer. She won a silver medal in the 4 × 100 m freestyle relay at the 1972 Summer Olympics, as well as two gold medals in the 100 m and 4 × 100 m freestyle events at the 1970 European Aquatics Championships.

References

External links 
 

1955 births
Living people
German female freestyle swimmers
Olympic swimmers of East Germany
Swimmers at the 1972 Summer Olympics
Olympic silver medalists for East Germany
Medalists at the 1972 Summer Olympics
Swimmers from Leipzig
European Aquatics Championships medalists in swimming
Olympic silver medalists in swimming
20th-century German women
21st-century German women